"The Way Life Goes" is a single by American rapper Lil Uzi Vert from their debut album Luv Is Rage 2 (2017). The song was released as the album's second single to urban contemporary radio on October 3, 2017. The track was produced by Don Cannon and Ike Beatz, and features vocals from the British indie pop group Oh Wonder sampled from their 2015 song "Landslide". The remix to the single was released on November 3 with a guest appearance from rapper Nicki Minaj. It peaked at number 24 on the US Billboard Hot 100.

Remix
A remix to the single was released on November 3, 2017, with a guest appearance from American rapper and singer Nicki Minaj.

Chart performance
"The Way Life Goes" debuted at number 39 on the Billboard Hot 100 for the chart dated September 23, 2017. In mid-December of the same year, it reached its new peak of 24 following an upsurge sparked by the Nicki Minaj assisted remix and visual.

Critical reception
Paul A. Thompson of Pitchfork opined that "[In] 'The Way Life Goes,' which is produced by Don Cannon and Ike Beatz, Uzi opens with a brief introduction to the other half of [their] failed relationship, punctuated with, "I like that girl too much, I wish I never met her." From there, [they launch] into a full interpolation of the first verse from Oh Wonder's "Landslide": "I know it hurts sometimes, but you’ll get over it/You’ll find another life to live." Uzi's less interested in the granular drama of the breakup than in the fallout, the moment three or four days later when reality starts to set in."

Personnel
Credits adapted from YouTube and Tidal.
Jaycen Joshua – mixing
Michael Piroli – mixing
Kesha Lee – engineering
Chris Athens – mastering
David Skinner - graphic design

Charts

Weekly charts

Year-end charts

Certifications

References

2017 singles
2017 songs
Atlantic Records singles
Lil Uzi Vert songs
Nicki Minaj songs
Song recordings produced by Don Cannon
Songs written by Lil Uzi Vert
Songs written by Don Cannon